The eleventh season of the Australian competitive cooking competition show My Kitchen Rules, titled The Rivals,  premiered on the Seven Network on 2 February 2020.

Applications for contestants opened during the airing of the tenth season. Pete Evans returned as series judge, with Colin Fassnidge and Manu Feildel acting as a judge/mentor in the challenge/elimination rounds.

The start date for the season was confirmed as 2 February 2020.

This was Evans' final season as he quit in May 2020.

Format changes

Contestants - This season was "Fans vs Favourites" - with 5 pairs of Fans competing against 5 pairs of Favourites - 4 pairs from past-seasons and a 5th Hybrid team, consisting of two former-pairs forming a new pair.
Teams - The contestants were split into two teams, the Fans represented the House of Colin (Harbourside Mansion) and the Faves represented the House of Manu (Inner City Warehouse). 
Judges - Pete Evans quit judging this season. For every round as Manu Feildel will be a mentor along with Colin Fassnidge who will only judge their opposing teams.
Prize Money - This prize money has been reduced from $250,000 to $100,000.
 Instant Restaurant Rules - Each team was mentored by Manu or Colin during their cooks. This year, the teams did not score individually and they scored in their house instead. After the round, the lowest scoring team from each house went head to head into an Elimination Cook-off where one was eliminated. The team cooking sets out instructions for the teammates to set up the instant restaurants during the cooking team's shopping period.
 Restaurant Takeover - Each house had to choose representations to cook two courses in restaurants in Australia. The judges, public and the other house scored each team's two-course meal and after the round, the house with the lower point (the total point of the representations) chose one team in the house while the other house chose one team to cook in the Elimination Cook-off.
 Semi-Final - Ultimate Instant Restaurant - Instead of the format of the previous seasons that two teams cooked-off every night, the Top 4 cooked in the UIR Round to have a slot in the Grand Final. However, everyone including teams which are eliminated came back to judge the food as jury. Moreover, teams only had to cook 1 dish per course instead of 2. After this round, the two highest scoring teams went into the Grand Final.
 Grand Final - This year, teams cooked in a restaurant in Sydney instead of the MKR Headquarters. Each grand-finalist had to cook a four-course meal including Canape, Entrée, Main and Dessert. Judges  Pete, Manu and Colin voted, making the total possible score 30 instead of 60.

Teams

Note
 Jake and Elle were originally part of the House of Manu but in the Top 6 competed for the House of Colin due to the lack of teams in the challenge but then they chose to go back to House Manu.

Elimination history

Note
 The ranking on this list is from both houses as well as the individual houses. Individual house ranks are in brackets. 
 Jake and Elle were originally part of the House of Manu but in the Top 6 competed for the House of Colin due to the lack of teams in the challenge but then they chose to go back to House Manu.

Competition Details

Instant Restaurants
During the Instant Restaurant rounds, each team hosted a three-course dinner for judges and fellow teams in both house. They were scored and ranked among the guests, each house deciding the score together. After the round, the lowest scoring team from each house took part in an elimination cook-off.
Episode 1 to 10
Airdate – 2 February to 17 February
Description – All teams joined together for the instant restaurants. The Fans cooked in the House of Colin (Harbourside Mansion) and the Faves cooked in the House of Manu (Inner City Warehouse), and each team was helped by Manu or Colin. After the round, the lowest scoring team from each house took part in an elimination cook-off.

 Notes
During Jac & Shaz's Instant Restaurant, Sophia & Romel walked out, therefore the scores are from the other 3 Faves team
 The ranking on this list is from both houses as well as the individual houses. Individual house ranks are in brackets.

Elimination Cook-off
Episode 11
Airdate – 18 February 
Description – Being the two bottom scoring teams from each house Roula & Rachael and Jenni & Louise faced off in a Elimination Cook-Off. The lower scoring team was eliminated.

Top 9

Faves Restaurant Takeover: Mexican Street Food Challenge
Episode 12
Airdate – 19 February 
Description – The Faves selected three teams to represent their house at El Camini Cantina The Rocks for the challenge. Each representing team cooked two courses for the judges, the other teams and the public. After both houses cooked, the lowest scoring house had each team from that house participate in an elimination challenge.

Fans Restaurant Takeover: Asian Street Food Challenge
Episode 13
Airdate – 20 February 
Description – The Fans selected three teams to represent their house at District 8 for the challenge. Each representing team cooked two courses for the judges, the other teams and the public. After both houses cooked, the lowest scoring house had each team from that house participate in an elimination challenge.

Elimination Cook-off
Episode 14
Airdate – 24 February
Description – Two teams from House of Colin faced each other in an elimination cook-off. The first team to compete was selected by House of Manu, while the second team to compete was chosen by House of Colin among themselves. The lower scoring team was eliminated.

Top 8

Faves Restaurant Takeover:  Pub Grub Challenge
Episode 15
Airdate – 25 February 
Description – The Faves selected three teams to represent their house at The Imperial Hotel - Drag N' Dine for the challenge. Each representing team cooked two courses for the judges, the other teams, the guested drag queens and the public. After both houses cooked, the lowest scoring house had each team from that house participate in an elimination challenge.

Fans Restaurant Takeover:  Pub Classics Challenge
Episode 16
Airdate – 26 February 
Description – The Fans selected three teams to represent their house at The Terminus Hotel for the challenge. Each representing team cooked two courses for the judges, the other team and the public. After both houses cooked, the lowest scoring house had each team from that house participate in an elimination challenge.

Elimination Cook-off
Episode 17
Airdate – 1 March
Description – Two teams from House of Manu faced each other in an elimination cook-off. The first team to compete was selected by House of Colin, while the second team to compete was chosen by House of Manu among themselves. The lower scoring team was eliminated.

Top 7

Faves Restaurant Takeover: Modern Australia Challenge
Episode 18
Airdate – 2 March
Description – The Faves selected three teams to represent their house at Meat & Wine Co. for the challenge. Each representing team cooked two courses of Mod Aus for the judges, the other teams and the public. After both houses cooked, the lowest scoring house had each team from that house participate in an elimination challenge.

Fans Restaurant Takeover: Modern Australia Challenge
Episode 19
Airdate – 3 March 
Description – The Fans selected three teams to represent their house at Butcher And The Farmer for the challenge. Each representing team cooked two courses for the judges, the other team and the public. After both houses cooked, the lowest scoring house had each team from that house participate in an elimination challenge.

Elimination Cook-off
Episode 20
Airdate – 4 March
Description – Two teams from House of Colin faced each other in an elimination cook-off. The first team to compete was selected by House of Manu, while the second team to compete was chosen by House of Colin among themselves. The lower scoring team was eliminated.

Top 6

Faves Restaurant Takeover: Fine Dining Challenge
Episode 21
Airdate – 8 March
Description – The remaining Faves teams cooked two courses of Fine Dining at Stanton & Co. for the judges, the other teams and the public. After both houses cooked, the lowest scoring house had each team from that house participate in an elimination challenge.

Fans Restaurant Takeover: Fine Dining Challenge
Episode 22
Airdate – 9 March 
Description – The remaining Fans teams cooked two courses of Fine Dining at Nour for the judges, the other teams and the public. After both houses cooked, the lowest scoring house had each team from that house participate in an elimination challenge. 

Note
Jake and Elle were originally part of the House of Manu but in the Top 6 competed for the House of Colin due to the lack of teams in the challenge but then they go back to House Manu (in the semi-finals).

Elimination Cook-off
Episode 23
Airdate – 10 March
Description – Two teams from House of Manu faced each other in an elimination cook-off. The first team to compete is selected by House of Colin, while the second team to compete is chosen by House of Manu among themselves. The lower scoring team was eliminated.

Top 5: Finals Decider
Episode 24
Airdate – 11 March
Description – All remaining teams gathered at Colin's House for these challenges. They all cooked their platter on a barbecue. In the first round, they had 30 minutes to cook a vegetarian platter for the judges and their families. The judges decided the winning team which sat out from the next challenge, while the other 4 teams cooked a family meatlover platter for the judges, the judges' families and their families in 90 minutes. The lowest scoring team in the second challenge was eliminated.

Semi-final

Ultimate Instant Restaurants
 Episodes 25 to 28
 Air date — 15 to 23 March
 Description — The four remaining teams joined together for the Ultimate Instant Restaurant round using the same format as for the Instant Restaurant Round. Other teams who had been eliminated came to judge the food and act as a jury, while the finalists were scored individually. The two teams with the highest score went into the Grand Final. Unlike previous Ultimate Instant Restaurants, teams only had to serve 1 option per course.

Notes
 Despite losing their chance to be in the Grand Final in Episode 27 due to having the lowest score, Kerry and Kaylene scored individually at Mark and Lauren's UIR as they were still a Finalist team and were not officially eliminated until Mark and Lauren's scores were revealed.

Grand Final
 Episodes 29
 Air date — 24 March
 Description — Jake and Elle took on Dan and Steph in this Grand Final rematch from the fourth season. They had to cook a four-course meal for the judges, the eliminated teams and their family and friends. The judges scored each set of 4 meals out of 10 for the final verdict.

Ratings
 Colour Key:
  – Highest Rating
  – Lowest Rating
  – Elimination Episode
  – Finals Week

Notes

References

External links 
 
My Kitchen Rules on 7plus

2020 Australian television seasons
My Kitchen Rules